is a former Japanese Nippon Professional Baseball player. He played with the Yomiuri Giants in Japan's Central League.

On October 3, 2018, he announced retirement after the season.

References

External links

1985 births
Japanese baseball players
Living people
Nippon Professional Baseball pitchers
Baseball people from Hiroshima Prefecture
Yomiuri Giants players